The Central New York Telephone and Telegraph Building, also known as the Onondaga Historical Association Building,  designed by Henry W. Wilkinson, was listed on the National Register of Historic Places in 1973, and is part of the Montgomery Street-Columbus Circle Historic District, listed in 1979.  It was the first building in Syracuse designed specifically to house the telephone company, and did so from 1899 to 1905, when the company moved to bigger facilities.  In 1905, the Onondaga Historical Association purchased the building.

References

Buildings and structures in Syracuse, New York
Telephone exchange buildings
Telecommunications buildings on the National Register of Historic Places
National Register of Historic Places in Syracuse, New York
Commercial buildings on the National Register of Historic Places in New York (state)
Central New York